Claremont is a suburb of Cape Town, South Africa.  It is situated 9 kilometres south of the city, and is one of the so-called "Southern Suburbs", it is situated alongside Lansdowne.  It is an important commercial and residential area, which is currently experiencing significant growth and development.

History
Until the arrival of Dutch colonists in 1652, the uncultivated veld of the Cape Peninsula was used by the nomadic Khoisan as grazing for their cattle.  The Dutch established an outpost on the shore of Table Bay, and in 1657 they established a number of farms south of the outpost.  The most southerly of those original farms, named Louwvliet and Questenburg, are today covered by the suburbs of Claremont and Newlands.

The area was agricultural for about 150 years.  Other estates that were established included Veldhuyzen in 1676, Stellenberg in 1697, Weltevreden (originally part of Stellenberg) in 1730, Sans Souci (originally part of Questenburg) in 1786, and The Vineyard in 1798.  They produced grain and grapes, and some farmers made wine.

After the colony had been taken over by the British in 1814, the character of the area gradually changed from agricultural to residential.  British settlers and officials bought the farms, renamed some of them, and turned them into country residences.  Weltevreden was subdivided in 1822, and it was a portion of it that was later to be renamed Claremont.
The distinguished British astronomer Sir John Herschel put the area on the map by living at Feldhausen (formerly Veldhuyzen) from 1834 to 1838.

Village (1840–1886)
A village began to develop on the main road near Feldhausen in the 1830s, and by 1840 it had become known as 'Claremont'.  The annual Cape Almanac for 1840 described the area and stated that :

The new village of 'Claremont' succeeds, near to which, on the left, is 'Claremont House', the property of R. Waters Esq, who has lately laid out the grounds with much taste, in the manner usually known as the English style of landscape gardening.

The village grew during the 1840s and 1850s.  Public transport consisted of horse-drawn omnibuses which plied along the Main Road from 1837 until the railway was opened in 1864. In 1845 the timber merchant Ralph Henry Arderne started work on what would become the Arderne Gardens. The gardens, by then regionally renowned, were bought by the municipal government and turned into a public park in 1928.

In 1863, the Anglo-Italian immigrant and businessman John Molteno, who was later to become the Cape Colony's first prime minister, bought 140 acres of land centred on the Claremont House estate. The property was subdivided and developed from 1897 onwards, and Claremont House itself, situated in modern terms between Molteno Road to Pine Road, was later demolished. However its two extensions, Greenfield House and Barkly House, still stand today as schools. 
 

The opening of the railway from Cape Town to Wynberg in 1864 spurred subdivision and development.  The Feldhausen estate (also known as "The Grove") was subdivided in 1869–1870. A new Congregational Church was built on the Main Road in 1877.  The Claremont Hall was opened in 1879.

The land along Lansdowne Road east of the railway line was subdivided and developed from 1882, creating a large residential area which is now known as "Harfield Village".

Municipality (1886–1913)

In 1882, a village management board was formed, and in 1886 it was replaced by the Municipality of Claremont, which managed neighbouring Newlands too.  The privately owned Claremont Hall was taken over as a town hall.  The first telephone system was installed in the early 1880s.

There was further residential development, with the subdivision of the Claremont House, Lansdowne, Milburn House, and Paradise estates in the 1890s.  An electricity power station was built, and an electric tramway service was introduced in 1897.

The housing boom which followed the Anglo-Boer War saw the subdivision of further estates in the 1900s.  Most streets were named in 1903–1904, many of them thematically (e.g. after saints, explorers, British counties and towns, American presidents, and British politicians).

Suburb (1913–  )
In 1913, Claremont and several other municipalities were incorporated into the city of Cape Town.

Considerable residential growth took place in the 1920s and 1930s, when estates such as Palmyra, Keurboom, Ravensworth, Sanatorium Estate, The Vineyard, Wyndover, and Edinburgh Estate were subdivided and developed.  An additional railway station, named "Harfield Road", was built in 1931.

The government enforced its apartheid system on Claremont in the 1960s, forcing the Coloured residents to leave.  As a result, large areas of the suburb stood derelict for several years.

Claremont remained predominantly residential until the early 1970s, when commercial development began.  A major shopping mall, named Cavendish Square, was opened in 1973, and other shopping centres followed.

There was a further building boom in the 1990s, and the suburb is currently experiencing another, which includes the construction of three large apartment blocks, a hotel, two office blocks, the re-modeling of three other commercial buildings, and the construction of a transport interchange and a bypass road.

Places of worship

Claremont places of worship, past and present:

 Claremont Congregational Church (1840- )
 Claremont Mosque  (1851- )
 St Saviour's Church (Anglican)  (1854- )
 St Matthew's Church (Anglican)  (1888- )
 Claremont Methodist Church  (1890s- )
 Salvation Army Claremont Temple (1898–   )
 Claremont Baptist Church <ref>Tudor, D. (1980) Claremont Baptist Church 1905–80</ref> (1902- )
 Claremont Wynberg Hebrew Congregation  (1904- )
 New Apostolic Church (1905- )
 Old Apostolic Church
 Harvey Road Mosque (1908- )
 Al-Jamiah Mosque (1911- )
 Seventh Day Adventist Church
 St Ignatius Church (Roman Catholic) (1930- )
 East Claremont Congregational Church (1932- )
 Christ the King (Anglican) (1941- )
 St Stephen's Church (Reformed Evangelical Church REACH SA - formerly Church of England) (1941- )
 Dutch Reformed Church (1941–1991)
 St Bernard's Church (Roman Catholic) (1955- )
 Christian Science Church (1959- )
 Assembly of God
 Church of the Nazarene (1975- )
 Bethany Fellowship Full Gospel Church

Schools

Some Claremont schools, past and present:
 Mrs Harris's (later Mrs Midgley's) seminary (1840–1849)
 St Saviour's Grammar School (1878–1885) 
 Grove Primary School  (1885- )
 Claremont Primary school (1892- )
 Union College (1893- ) – in 1919 it moved to Spion Kop close to Ladysmith in Natal. In 1928 it moved to Somerset West and was renamed Helderberg College. Today it is called Helderberg College Of Higher Education. 
 Western Province Primary School  (1913- )
 Talfalah Institute (1917- ) – moved to Athlone in 1971
 Herschel Girls School (1922- )
 Lady Buxton Children's Home (1923- )
 Livingstone High School (1926- )
 Rosmead Central Primary School (1940- )
 Barkly House (1945- )
 Batavia School
 Oasis Association (1952- )
 Greenfield Girls' Primary School (1957- )
 Bel Porto School for Severely Mentally Handicapped 
 Abbott's College
 Claremont High School
Sans Souci Girls' High School

Commerce and industry

Some Claremont businesses, past and present:
 Oasis Association (1965–present)
 Coimbra Bakery (1964- )
 Orchard's Hotel (later Crown Hotel) (1836-c1969)
 Lansdowne (later Claremont) Hotel (1880s-2001)
 F.J. Pearce & Co (1882–1966)
 Hall's Pharmacy (1892-1970s)
 Vineyard Hotel (1893- )
 Henshilwoods (1894–1998)
 Brenner's Stores (1904- )
 Pavilion Cinema (1912-1930s)
 Star (later Orpheum) Cinema (1912-1960s)
 Scala (later Protea) Cinema (1938–1992)
 Cavendish Square shopping mall (1973- )
 Werdmuller Centre shopping mall (1975- )
 Kenilworth Centre shopping mall (1974- )
 The Atrium (now Stadium-on-Main) shopping centre (1990- )
 Heritage College
 Cape Town School of English 
 Cape Town International School of Languages
 Adèle Beauty Therapy School
 Cape Town School of Eurythmy 
 School of Practical Philosophy 

Many national banks and chains of shops have branches in Claremont.

Sport

Some Claremont sports clubs and facilities, past and present:
 Claremont Cricket Club (1876- ) – no longer in Claremont
 Kenilworth Racecourse (1882- ) – Kenilworth later became a suburb in its own right
 Violets Rugby Club (c1886- ) – moved to Crawford in the 1970s
 Villagers' Rugby Football Club (1875 -) – moved to Claremont from Mowbray in 1898.
 Claremont Swimming Baths (1895-1960s)
 Claremont Tennis Club (1908- )
 Rosmead Sports Ground (1921- )
 Cape Technical College Grounds (1927- )
 Ackerman's Sports Grounds (later Impala Park) (1920s-2000s)
 Celtic Harriers Athletics Club (1970- )

Medical

Claremont's first medical facility may have been the temporary isolation hospital set up during the 1882 smallpox epidemic.  Other medical facilities, past and present:

 Claremont Medical & Surgical Sanatorium (1896–1901)
 Kingsbury Maternity Home (1945- )
 Claremont Medical Centre (1970- ) – on the old Crown Hotel site
 Kingsbury Hospital (1990s- )

Public amenities

 Claremont Post Office (1846-2019)
 Claremont Town Hall (1879–1946)
 Claremont Library (1897- )
 Arderne Gardens (1927- )
 Clareinch Nurses' War Memorial Home (1934- ) – moved to Pinelands in the 1960s
 Janet Bourhill Institute (1944- ) – moved to Bonteheuwel in the 1970s
 Clareinch Post Office (1936- )
 Claremont Civic Centre (1960- )

Footnotes

References
 Field, S. (Ed) (2001). Lost Communities, Living Memories.
 Henshilwood, N. (1972).  A Cape Childhood.
 Louw, J. & Malan L. (1984). The Louws of Louwvliet.
 Murray, J. (1958).  Claremont Album.
 Playne, S. (1911).  Cape Colony – Its Commerce, Industry and Resources.
 Tredgold, A. (1990).  The Ardernes and their Garden''.

External links
 Claremont Central
 The Claremont Community Website
 Claremont Directory

Suburbs of Cape Town